Austin Vanderford (born March 21, 1990) is an American professional mixed martial artist, currently signed to Bellator MMA where he competes in the Middleweight division. As of February 7, 2023, he is #6 in the Bellator Middleweight Rankings.

Background

Vanderford was born in Santa Rosa, California, before moving at the age of 9 months old to Ninilchik, Alaska and developing a taste for competitive sport while wrestling for his high school team, where he became a 2-time Alaska State Wrestling Champion (2007-160 lbs, 2006-152 lbs) both his junior and senior years. After moving to Southern Oregon University, Vanderford joined the wrestling team, becoming the NAIA National Wrestling Champion (184 lbs.) in 2012 and was a 2-time NAIA All-American wrestler. After finishing his college career graduating with a Bachelors degree, he took up a coaching job with the University for a couple of years, before following his desire to fight and moved swiftly on to the lower ranks of the welterweight MMA circuit and effortlessly winning all four bouts of his amateur career.

Mixed martial arts career

Early career
Making his professional debut at Prime Fighting 9 on March 11, 2017, Vanderford faced Sol Renato, going on to defeat him via TKO in first round. He went on to defeat his next two opponents, Adam Fugitt and Ben Fodor, both via unanimous decisions, winning the CageSport Welterweight title against the later at CageSport 47. He would go on to tap out Kenny Licea in the second round via rear-naked choke at VFC 59, before he was invited to face Angelo Trevino on July 17, 2018 at Dana White's Contender Series 13. He won the fight via a rear-naked choke in round two, however did not secure a contract with the UFC. In his last bout on the regionals, Vanderford faced Brazil’s Edmilson Freitas, knocking him out in the first round.

Bellator MMA
After going undefeated in 6 bouts on the regional scene, Vanderford signed a multi-fight contract with Bellator MMA.

In his debut appearance with Bellator MMA at Bellator 215 on February 15, 2019, he took on Cody Jones and submitted him via arm-triangle choke in the first round.

Vanderford faced Joseph Creer at Bellator 225 on August 25, 2019, winning the bout after the doctor stopped the fight after the second round.

On November 15, 2019 at  Bellator 234, he faced Russian submission specialist Grachik Bozinyan, defeating him via unanimous decision.

Vanderford was scheduled to face Daniel Madrid on September 12, 2020 at Bellator 246. However, he had to pull out of the bout due to unknown reasons.

Vanderford was scheduled to face Chris Curtis on November 5, 2020 at Bellator 251. However, Curtis had to pull out of the bout due to a positive COVID test and was replaced by Vinicius de Jesus. Vanderford won the bout via unanimous decision.

Vanderford faced Fabian Edwards on May 21, 2021 at Bellator 259, defeating him via unanimous decision.

Vanderford fought for the Bellator Middleweight World Championship against Gegard Mousasi at Bellator 275 on February 25, 2022 at the 3Arena in Dublin, Ireland. He lost the fight via technical knockout in round one.

Vanderford was scheduled to face Anthony Adams at Bellator 284 on August 12, 2022. After Adams pulled out of the bout 2 weeks before the event, Aaron Jeffery stepped in on short notice. He lost the bout in the first round via TKO stoppage.

Personal life 
In September 2018, Vanderford married Paige VanZant, a former UFC strawweight. The couple began dating the previous year, and Vanderford proposed to VanZant in January 2018.

Championships and accomplishments
CageSport
CS Welterweight Championship (One time; former)

Mixed martial arts record

|-
|Loss
|align=center|11–2
|Aaron Jeffery
|TKO (punches)
|Bellator 284
|
|align=center|1
|align=center|1:25
|Sioux Falls, South Dakota, United States
|
|-
|Loss
|align=center|11–1
|Gegard Mousasi
|TKO (punches)
|Bellator 275
|
|align=center|1
|align=center|1:25
|Dublin, Ireland
|
|-
|Win
|align=center|11–0
|Fabian Edwards
|Decision (unanimous)
|Bellator 259 
|
|align=center|3
|align=center|5:00
|Uncasville, Connecticut, United States
|
|-
|Win
|align=center|10–0
|Vinicius de Jesus
|Decision (unanimous)
|Bellator 251
|
|align=center|3
|align=center|5:00
|Uncasville, Connecticut, United States
|
|-
|Win
|align=center|9–0
|Grachik Bozinyan
|Decision (unanimous)
| Bellator 234
| 
|align=center|3
|align=center|5:00
| Tel Aviv, Israel
|
|-
|Win
|align=center|8–0
|Joseph Creer
|TKO (doctor stoppage)
|Bellator 225
|
|align=center|2
|align=center|5:00
|Bridgeport, Connecticut, United States
|
|-
|Win
|align=center|7–0
|Cody Jones
|Submission (arm-triangle choke)
|Bellator 215
|
|align=center|1
|align=center|4:49
|Uncasville, Connecticut, United States
|
|-
|Win
|align=center|6–0
|Edmilson Freitas
|KO (punch)
|Final Fight Championship 32
|
|align=center|1
|align=center|1:38
|Las Vegas, Nevada, United States
|
|-
|Win
|align=center|5–0
|Angelo Trevino
|Submission (rear-naked choke)
|Dana White's Contender Series 13
|
|align=center|2
|align=center|2:42
|Las Vegas, Nevada, United States
|
|-
|Win
|align=center|4–0
|Kenny Licea
|Submission (rear-naked choke)
|Victory FC 59
|
|align=center|2
|align=center|4:03
|Omaha, Nebraska, United States
|
|-
|Win
|align=center|3–0
|Ben Fodor
|Decision (unanimous)
|CageSport 47
|
|align=center|5
|align=center|5:00
|Tacoma, Washington, United States
|
|-
|Win
|align=center|2–0
|Adam Fugitt
|Decision (unanimous)
|Arena Wars: Total Kombat
|
|align=center|3
|align=center|5:00
|Medford, Oregon, United States
|
|-
|Win
|align=center|1–0
|Sol Renato
|TKO (punches)
|Prime Fighting 9
|
|align=center|1
|align=center|2:33
|Ridgefield, Washington, United States
|
|-

Amateur mixed martial arts record

|-
| Win
|align=center| 4–0
| Erik Herman
| Decision (unanimous)
|Arena Wars: Redemption
| 
|align=center| 5
|align=center| 3:00
| Grants Pass, Oregon, United States
| 
|-
| Win
|align=center| 3–0
| Daniel Pihl
| Submission (triangle choke)
|Rumble at the Roseland 85
| 
|align=center| 2
|align=center| 1:15
|Portland, Oregon, United States
| 
|-
| Win
|align=center| 2–0
|  Michael Collazo
| TKO (punches)
|Budofights 13
| 
|align=center| 1
|align=center| 2:59
| Bend, Oregon, United States
| 
|-
| Win
|align=center| 1–0
| Eric McConico
| Submission (arm-triangle choke)
|Battle in the Burg 3
| 
|align=center| 1
|align=center| 2:30
|Roseburg, Oregon, United States
|

Submission grappling record
{| class="wikitable sortable" style="font-size:80%; text-align:left;"
|-
| colspan=8 style="text-align:center;" | ? Matches, ? Wins (? Submissions), ? Losses (? Submissions), ? Draws
|-
!  Result
!  style="text-align:center;"| Rec.
!  Opponent
!  Method
!  Event
!  Division
!  Date
!  Location
|-
 
|Loss
|style="text-align:center;"|2–2–0
| Gabriel Checco
| Submission (Rear Naked Choke)
|Submission Underground 14
|
|May 31, 2020
| Portland, Oregon, U.S.
|- 
|win
|style="text-align:center;"|2–1–0
| Richie Martinez
| Submission (Arm Triangle Choke)
|Submission Underground 13
|
|April 26, 2020
| Portland, Oregon, U.S.
|- 
|win
|style="text-align:center;"|1–1–0
| Micah Brakefield
| Submission (Arm Triangle Choke)
|Submission Underground 11
|
|February 23, 2020
| Portland, Oregon, U.S.
|-
|Loss
|style="text-align:center;"|0–1–0
| Jake Shields
| N/A
|Submission Underground 8
|
|May 12, 2019
| Portland, Oregon, U.S.
|-

See also
 List of current Bellator fighters
 List of male mixed martial artists

References

External links 
  
  

1990 births
Living people
American male mixed martial artists
Middleweight mixed martial artists
Mixed martial artists utilizing collegiate wrestling
American male sport wrestlers
Amateur wrestlers
People from Kenai Peninsula Borough, Alaska
Bellator male fighters